George Lockhart (1877 – unknown) was a Scottish professional footballer who played as a left full-back.

References

1877 births
Year of death unknown
Footballers from South Ayrshire
Scottish footballers
Association football defenders
Bolton Wanderers F.C. players
Burnley F.C. players
English Football League players